John Finucane (1843 – 23 March 1902) was an Irish farmer and politician.

Finucane was educated at Thurles College (taking first honours in rhetoric, logic and metaphysic) and Maynooth College, with the intention of joining the priesthood. Instead he became a farmer, and was for many years Honorary Secretary of the Limerick and Clare Farmers' Club.

From 1885 to 1900 he was Member of Parliament for County Limerick East, representing the Irish Parliamentary Party. At the time of the Parnell split he was an anti-Parnellite. He lived in Coole House, Caherelly, County Limerick.

Notes

External links 

John Finucane listing on 1901 Census of Ireland

1843 births
1902 deaths
Irish Parliamentary Party MPs
Anti-Parnellite MPs
Members of the Parliament of the United Kingdom for County Limerick constituencies (1801–1922)
UK MPs 1885–1886
UK MPs 1886–1892
UK MPs 1892–1895
UK MPs 1895–1900
Alumni of St. Patrick's College, Thurles
Alumni of St Patrick's College, Maynooth
Date of birth missing